Nils Peter Sundelin (born 13 January 1947) is a retired Swedish sailor. Together with his elder brothers Jörgen and Ulf he won a gold medal in the 5.5 metre class at the 1968 Olympics and a silver medal at the 1969 World Championships. The brothers also won the 1971 world title in the three-person keelboat (Dragon class) and placed sixth and ninth at the 1972 and 1976 Olympics, respectively. 

Peter was the strongest physically among the Sundelin brothers. In the 1980s, he competed with different partners in the two-person keelboat at the 1980 Olympics and world championships. Besides sailing he played ice hockey for Skuru IK.

References

1947 births
Living people
Swedish male sailors (sport)
Olympic sailors of Sweden
Sailors at the 1968 Summer Olympics – 5.5 Metre
Sailors at the 1972 Summer Olympics – Dragon
Sailors at the 1976 Summer Olympics – Soling
Sailors at the 1980 Summer Olympics – Star
Olympic gold medalists for Sweden
Olympic medalists in sailing
Soling class sailors
Royal Swedish Yacht Club sailors
Medalists at the 1968 Summer Olympics